Domenico Guglielmini (Bologna, 27 September 1655 - Padua, 27 July 1710) was an Italian mathematician, chemist and physician, active and successful mainly in Bologna and Padua.

Life 

Born in Bologna to a well-off family, he graduated in medicine in 1678 with Marcello Malpighi at the University of Bologna, at the same time he studied mathematics with Geminiano Montanari and became a member of the Academia della Traccia o dei Filosofi.

His first mathematical writings topic was astronomy, but later he focused his studies on hydraulics. In 1686 he was named "Bologna General Water Administrator", an important role due to the large number of watercourses existing in the area and the frequent flooding that required surveillance.
The experience gave inspiration for his well known work "Della natura dei fiumi" which is considered a masterpiece of modern river hydraulics. 
 
He married Costanza Gioannetti and had three daughters and a son, Giuseppe Ferdinando, who became his biographer. In 1690 he was appointed professor of mathematics at the University of Bologna and in 1694 professor of Hydrometry.

In 1698 he was invited by the prestigious University of Padua to teach mathematics,  astronomy and medicine and to collaborate in the restoration of the fortifications of Kotor in Dalmatia (today Montenegro).

He died in 1709 after eight months of agony for a cerebral hemorrhage. He was buried in the church of St. Massimo in Padua and a sumptuous monument was erected in the Basilica of Saint Anthony of Padua.

Works
 Domenico Guglielmini, Dominici Gulielmini ... Opera omnia mathematica, hydraulica, medica, et physica. Accessit vita autoris, a Jo. Baptista Morgagni ... cum figuris & indicibus necessariis, Tomus primus, Tomus secundus, Genevae : sumptibus Cramer, Perachon & socii, 1719

Hydraulics

 Domenico Guglielmini, Dominici Gulielmini medici et mathematici Boniensis Epistolae duae hydrostaticae altera apologetica aduersus obseruationes contra mens. aquarum fluentium a clarissimo viro Dionisio Papino factas...altera de velocitate, & motu fluidorum in siphonibus recuruis suctorijs, Bononiae : apud h.h. Antonij Pisarij, 1692.

 Della natura de' fiumi trattato fisico-matematico del dott. Domenico Guglielmini. - Nuova edizione con le annotazioni di Eustachio Manfredi. ... - In Bologna : nella stamperìa di Lelio dalla Volpe, 1739.
 Domenico Guglielmini, Risposta al parere de' molto reverendi padri Seur e Jacquier sopra i diversi progetti per il regolamento delle acque delle tre provincie di Bologna Ferrara e Romagna, In Firenze : appresso Andrea Bonducci, 1765.

Chemistry and crystallography
  Domenico Guglielmini, Riflessioni filosofiche dedotte dalle figure de' sali dal dottore Domenico Guglielmini espresse in vn discorso recitato nell'Accademia filosofica esperimentale di monsig. arcidiacono Marsigli la sera delli 21. marzo 1688, In Bologna : per gli eredi d'Antonio Pisarri, 1688.

 Domenico Guglielmini, De salibus dissertatio epistolaris physico-medico-mechanica conscripta a Dominico Guglielmini philosopho et medico Bononiensi, Lugduni Batavorum : apud Fredericum Haaring, 1707.

Medicine
 Domenico Guglielmini, De sanguinis natura & constitutione exercitatio physico-medica Dominici Gulielmini, Venetiis : ex typographia Andreae Poleti, 1701.
 Domenico Guglielmini, Dominici Guglielmini ... Exercitatio de idearum vitiis correctione & usu ad statuendam & inquirendam morborum naturam, Patavii : apud Josephum Corona, 1707.
 Domenico Guglielmini, Dominici Guglielmini ... Commentaria in primam Aphorismorum Hippocratis sectionem, a Josepho Ferdinando filio, nonnullis explicationibus locupletata & deficientium aucta. Praemittuntur praelectiones tres in idem argumento ab eodem Dominico, Bononiae: apud Thomam Colli ex typographia S. Thomae Aquinatis, 1748.

Physics and astronomy

 Domenico Guglielmini, De cometarum natura et ortu epistolica dissertatio occasione nouissimi cometae sub finem superioris anni; & inter initia currentis obseruati conscripta. Auctore Dominico Gulielmino, Bononiae : typis haeredis Dominici Barberij, 1681.
 Domenico Guglielmini, Pro theoria medica aduersus empiricam sectam praeletio habita Patavij die 2. Maij 1702. A Domenico Guglielmini bononiensi. Dum a mathematicarum scientiarum cathedra ad primam theoreticae medicinae transitum faceret, Venetiis : typis Hieronymi Albriccij, 1702.
 Domenico Guglielmini, Dominici Guglielmini ... De principio sulphureo dissertationes quibus mantissae loco accessit dissertatio de aethere, Venetiis : apud Andream Poleti, 1710.
 Domenico Guglielmini, Dominici Gulielmini ... Observatio solaris eclipsis anni 1684. Bononiae habita die 12. iulij eusdem anni, Patavij : typis Jo. Baptistae Conzatti, 1711.

References

Notes

Bibliography

 Eustachio Manfredi, "Vita di Domenico Guglielmini" nella Prefazione a Della natura de' fiumi trattato fisico matematico di Domenico Guglielmini con le annotazioni di Eustachio Manfredi, Bologna: tipografia Marsigli, 1821, pp. VII-XXXVI .
 Icilio Guareschi, Domenico Guglielmini e la sua opera scientifica, Estratto dal Supplemento annuale all'Enciclopedia di Chimica, diretta dal Prof. Icilio Guareschi, vol. XXX, Torino: Unione Tipografico Editrice Torinese, 1914 .
 
 
 
 
 Cesare F. Maffioli, "Domenico Guglielmini", in Professori e scienziati a Padova nel Settecento, a cura di Sandra Casellato e Luciana Sitran Rea, Treviso: Antilia, 2002, pp. 505–530.
 Alberto Vanzo, "Corpuscularism and Experimental Philosophy in Domenico Guglielmini's Reflections on Salts", in The Idea of Principles in Early Modern Thought. Interdisciplinary Perspectives, a cura di Peter Anstey, New York: Routledge, 2017, pp. 147–171. .
 

1655 births
1710 deaths
17th-century Italian mathematicians
17th-century Italian physicians
17th-century Italian astronomers
Fellows of the Royal Society
18th-century Italian astronomers
University of Bologna alumni
Academic staff of the University of Bologna